Ottawa–Carleton was a federal electoral district in Ontario, Canada that was represented in the House of Commons of Canada from 1968 to 1988. This riding was created in 1966 from parts of Carleton, Ottawa East and Russell ridings.

It initially consisted of the eastern parts of the city of Ottawa, the Village of Rockcliffe Park, the Township of Gloucester excluding Long Island, and the Township of Cumberland.

In 1976, the city of Ottawa parts of the riding were redefined.

The electoral district was abolished in 1987 when it was redistributed between Gloucester–Carleton, Ottawa South and Ottawa—Vanier ridings.

Members of Parliament

This riding has elected the following Members of Parliament:

Election results

|-

|Liberal
|John Turner
|align="right"|  28,987

|Progressive Conservative
|Kenneth C. Binks
|align="right"| 11,665

|New Democratic Party
|Harold B. Wilson
|align="right"| 3,115
|}

|-

|Liberal
|John Turner
|align="right"| 31,316

|Progressive Conservative
|Strome Galloway
|align="right"| 22,641

|New Democratic Party
|Doris Shackleton
|align="right"| 11,225

|}

|-

|Liberal
|John Turner
|align="right"| 38,463

|Progressive Conservative
|Bill Neville
|align="right"|27,588

|New Democratic Party
|Dave Hall
|align="right"| 6,014
|}

|-

|Progressive Conservative
|Jean Pigott
|align="right"| 34,477

|Liberal
|Henri L. Rocque
|align="right"| 18,796

|New Democratic Party
|Steven W. Langdon
|align="right"|12,777

|No affiliation
|Stewart I. Crawford
|align="right"|  716

|Independent
|Robert A. Leber
|align="right"|602
|}

|-

|Liberal
|Jean-Luc Pépin
|align="right"| 33,972

|Progressive Conservative
|Jean Pigott
|align="right"| 26,972

|New Democratic Party
|Jill Vickers
|align="right"| 8,234
|}

|-

|Liberal
|Jean-Luc Pépin
|align="right"|34,960

|Progressive Conservative
|Bert Lawrence
|align="right"|22,384

|New Democratic Party
|Don Francis
|align="right"|7,788

|No affiliation
|Oli Cosgrove
|align="right"| 235
|}

See also 

 List of Canadian federal electoral districts
 Past Canadian electoral districts

External links 

 Website of the Parliament of Canada

Former federal electoral districts of Ontario
Federal electoral districts of Ottawa